Hubert Joseph Dolez (16 March 1808 – 17 March 1880) was a Belgian lawyer and liberal politician.

As a politician, he was a member of the Belgian parliament, President of the Belgian Chamber of Representatives from 23 October 1867 until 20 May 1870 and Minister of State.

See also
 Liberal Party
 Liberalism in Belgium

Sources
 Hubert Joseph Dolez
 Wellens, R., in : Biographie Nationale, Brussels, Académie Royale des Sciences, des Lettres et des Beaux Arts, 1866–1986, XXXV, 1969–1970, kol. 190-192.
 Jadot, J.M., in : Biographie Coloniale Belge - Belgische Koloniale Biografie, Brussels, Koninklijk Belgisch Koloniaal Instituut, III, kol. 247.
 De Paepe, Jean-Luc, Raindorf-Gérard, Christiane (ed.), Le Parlement Belge 1831-1894. Données Biographiques, Brussels, Académie Royale de Belgique, 1996, p. 270.

1808 births
1880 deaths
Belgian Ministers of State
Presidents of the Chamber of Representatives (Belgium)
People from Mons